The Community Empowerment (Scotland) Act 2015 is an Act of the Scottish Parliament. The act is notable for expanding the Community Right to Buy established by the Land Reform (Scotland) Act 2003 to include urban communities and for introducing new powers for Scottish Ministers to compel owners of abandoned or neglected to land to interested community bodies.

Provisions
Provisions of the act are spread over eleven parts, covering different areas relating to community empowerment and public participation in policy and planning.

Part 1, National Outcomes, requires Scottish Ministers to continue the existing practice of setting national outcomes for Scotland, to which public authorities, people and organisations are to have regard when carrying out public functions. Ministers must regularly report progress toward them and to review them at least every five years.

Part 2, Community Planning, creates a statutory basis for Community Planning Partnerships, imposing duties on them to involve community bodies in the delivery of local outcomes and to produce “locality plans” for particularly disadvantaged areas.

Part 3, Participation Requests, provides a mechanism for community bodies to request participation in services to improve local outcomes, which can include community bodies taking responsibility for the delivery of services.

Part 4, Community Rights to Buy Land, amends the Land Reform (Scotland) Act 2003 to extend the community right to by to communities of any size, allowing urban communities to register an interest in land granting them first right of refusal should the land come up for sale. The act also introduces a new community right to buy land which is abandoned, neglected or causing harm to the environmental wellbeing of the community. This allows Scottish ministers to compel private owners of land to community bodies if they deem the sale likely to contribute to sustainable local development.

Part 5, Asset Transfer Requests, provides community bodies with the right to request to purchase, lease, manage or use land and buildings held by local authorities, Scottish ministers and other Scottish public bodies, of which relevant authorities will be required to create and maintain a publicly available register. In deciding whether to agree to asset transfers, public bodies are to consider the reduction of inequalities though there is a presumption of agreement unless there are reasonable grounds for refusal.

Part 6, Delegation of Forestry Commissioners’ Functions, allows for different types of community body to be involved in forestry leasing and to request asset transfers from Scotland’s National Forest Estate.

Part 7, Football Clubs, provides powers for Ministers to make regulations to facilitate supporters’ involvement in the decision making, and potentially ownership, of football clubs and give fans rights in these areas.

Part 8, Common Good Property, requires local authorities to establish and maintain a register of all common good property which they hold.  It also requires local authorities to inform and consult community bodies before disposing of or changing the use of common good assets.

Part 9, Allotments, updates and simplifies legislation on allotments.  It requires local authorities to take reasonable steps to provide allotments if waiting lists exceed certain trigger points and strengthens the protection for allotments. Provisions allow allotments to be 250 square metres in size or a different size that is to be agreed between the person requesting an allotment and the local authority.  The Act also requires fair rents to be set and allows tenants to sell surplus produce grown on an allotment, provided this is not intended to produce a profit. There is a requirement for local authorities to develop a food growing strategy for their area, including identifying land that may be used as allotment sites and identifying other areas of land that could be used by a community for the cultivation of vegetables, fruit, herbs or flowers.

Part 10, Participation in Public Decision-Making, creates new regulation-making powers enabling Ministers to require Scottish public authorities to promote and facilitate public participation in the decisions and activities of the authority, including in the allocation of its resources.

Part 11, Non-domestic rates, allows councils to create and fund their own localised business rates relief schemes, in addition to existing national rates relief.

Useful sources
Elliott, I.C., Fejszes, V. and Tàrrega, M. (2018), "The Community Empowerment Act and localism under devolution in Scotland: The perspective of multiple stakeholders in a council ward", International Journal of Public Sector Management. https://doi.org/10.1108/IJPSM-03-2018-0080

Lawson, L. and Kearns, A. (2010), “‘Community empowerment’ in the context of the Glasgow housing stock transfer”, Urban Studies, Vol. 47 No. 7, pp. 1459–1478. https://doi.org/10.1177/0042098009353619

Lawson, L. and Kearns, A. (2014), “Rethinking the purpose of community empowerment in neighbourhood regeneration”, Local Economy, Vol. 29 Nos 1-2, pp. 65–81. https://doi.org/10.1177/0269094213519307

Rolfe, S. (2016), “Divergence in community participation policy: analysing localism and community empowerment using a theory of change approach”, Local Government Studies, Vol. 42 No. 1, pp. 97–118. https://doi.org/10.1080/03003930.2015.1081848

See also
 Land Reform in Scotland
 Community ownership
 Land Reform (Scotland) Act 2003
 Land Reform (Scotland) Act 2016

References

2015
Land reform in Scotland